Admiral Byng may refer to:

 Admiral John Byng (1704–1757), British admiral, shot by sentence of a court martial
 Admiral George Byng, 1st Viscount Torrington (1668–1733), the first of several Viscounts Torrington
 Vice-Admiral George Byng, 6th Viscount Torrington

See also
 Byng (disambiguation)